Natalie Louise Cook   (born 19 January 1975) is an Australian professional beach volleyball player and Olympic gold medallist. She became the first Australian woman to compete at five Olympic Games.

Early life
Cook was born in Townsville, Queensland. She was the dux of her school, Corinda State High (located in the western suburbs of Brisbane).  She enrolled in pre-medicine college courses, and also took up volleyball, captaining the Australian Indoor Junior Team in 1992. In 1993 she began playing beach volleyball. In 1994 she went professional and gave up her pursuit of a medical degree.

Career

Cook partnered with Kerri Pottharst to represent Australia at the Atlanta Olympics in 1996, winning a bronze medal—the first time that beach volleyball had been an Olympic sport. In the same year, the pair won a silver medal at the world championships, and came first in the World Tour Event in Japan.

Cook and Pottharst did not play together again until 2000. They finished third in the World Tour Events, held in France and Portugal, and then participated in the 2000 Summer Olympics in Sydney. They dominated the competition, winning the gold medal. In the aftermath of their Olympic win, the pair were awarded the Medal of the Order of Australia. Cook and Pottharst were included in the Fédération Internationale de Volleyball's Team of the Decade.
After the Olympics, Pottharst retired, and Cook found a new partner in Nicole Sanderson. They won a bronze medal at the 2003 Beach Volleyball World Championships in Rio de Janeiro, and by the end of the 2003 world tour, were ranked fourth in the world. They were subsequently selected to represent Australia at the 2004 Athens Olympics. After a promising start, they finished out of medal contention, losing to teams from Brazil and the United States.  For the 2008 Summer Olympics, Cook partnered with Tamsin Barnett, finishing fifth overall.
On 1 August 2012, Cook's record breaking beach volleyball career came to an end with her elimination from her fifth games in London.

Personal life
Cook currently resides in Brisbane and is married to fellow beach volleyballer Sarah Maxwell. In addition to her sporting career, Cook tours on the public speaking circuit as a leading motivational speaker attracting big audiences and has launched her own beach volleyball-related business, Sandstorm.

Books
 Go Girl! (2001)
 Health & Wellbeing Millionaire

References

External links
 
 
 
 
 
 
 

1975 births
Living people
Australian women's beach volleyball players
Beach volleyball players at the 1996 Summer Olympics
Beach volleyball players at the 2000 Summer Olympics
Beach volleyball players at the 2004 Summer Olympics
Beach volleyball players at the 2008 Summer Olympics
Beach volleyball players at the 2012 Summer Olympics
Olympic beach volleyball players of Australia
Olympic bronze medalists for Australia
Olympic gold medalists for Australia
Olympic medalists in beach volleyball
LGBT volleyball players
Australian LGBT sportspeople
Lesbian sportswomen
Recipients of the Medal of the Order of Australia
Sportspeople from Townsville
Sportswomen from Queensland
Medalists at the 2000 Summer Olympics
Medalists at the 1996 Summer Olympics
Sport Australia Hall of Fame inductees